Alfred A. Gemma (born 1939) is an American politician who is a former  Democratic member of the Rhode Island House of Representatives, representing the 20th District from 2005, following his special election victory to fill the seat of the deceased Representative Paul V. Sherlock, to January 2011.  Gemma had previously served on the City Council of Warwick, Rhode Island. During the 2009-2010 sessions, he served on the House Committees on Corporation, Separation of Powers, Veterans Affairs and Oversight, and served Deputy Majority Leader. Gemma lost his bid for reelection in the 14 September 2010 Democratic primary to David A. Bennett, who went on to be elected in the 2 November general election.

Gemma is an auto body shop owner, currently owning Al Gemma's Auto Body in Warwick RI.  He previously owned Courtland Auto Body in Providence RI.

References

External links
Rhode Island House - Representative Alfred A. Gemma official RI House website

Democratic Party members of the Rhode Island House of Representatives
1939 births
Living people
Politicians from Warwick, Rhode Island
Providence College alumni
Brown University alumni
Rhode Island city council members